The Bavarian Class G 4/5 N was an early twentieth century German  steam locomotive built for the Royal Bavarian State Railways (K.Bay.Sts.B.). Its design was based on that of the Class E I and it had unmistakable similarities to the final series of that class. Had the K.Bay.Sts.B. not changed their locomotive classification system just before this engine was produced it may well have entered service as the latest variant of E I.

In developing the E I and G 4/5 N, advantage was taken of the knowledge gained from two goods locomotives bought from the United States and which were also classified as E I's.

The firm of Krauss supplied seven of these locomotives in 1905 and 1906. As a result of the relatively high position of the boiler, the firebox was located above the locomotive frame. This characteristic design feature of Bavarian locomotives, influenced by Maffei, could already be seen and was utilised subsequently by the Baden VIIIe, Swiss GB C 4/5 and eventually the Bavarian G 4/5 H - albeit the latter being developed by Maffei.

The Deutsche Reichsbahn took over four examples from the Bavarian State Railways, which had survived World War I and gave them the operating numbers 56 401–404. They continued in service until 1927.

The engines were equipped with a Bavarian 2'2' T 18,2 tender.

See also 
 Royal Bavarian State Railways
 List of Bavarian locomotives and railbuses

References

2-8-0 locomotives
G 4 5 N
Standard gauge locomotives of Germany
Krauss locomotives
Railway locomotives introduced in 1905
1′D n2 locomotives
Freight locomotives